Thomas William Chandler is a fictional character and the protagonist of the cable network TNT post-apocalyptic drama TV series The Last Ship.  He is portrayed by Eric Dane.

Background
The son of United States Army veteran Jed Chandler (Bill Smitrovich), Tom Chandler was born on December 9 and raised in Virginia along with a brother and a sister.  As a young man, Tom joined the United States Navy to spite his father, an army officer.

At an unknown point in time, he married a woman named Darien (Tracy Middendorf). They have a daughter, Ashley (Grace Kaufman), and a son, Sam (Aidan Sussman), and reside in Norfolk, Virginia, where his ship is homeported.

He speaks and reads fluent Russian, and has a book written by Admiral Konstantin Nikolajewitsch Ruskov (Ravil Isyanov) in his personal collection.

Arc
Chandler's naval career began in the 1990s upon his graduation from the United States Naval Academy in Annapolis, Maryland.

As a lieutenant, junior grade, Chandler served on  after completing a tour of duty in Iraq. The Pinckney'''s captain promoted him to full lieutenant; years later, Chandler gave his Lieutenant's bars to Lieutenant Alisha Granderson during her promotion ceremony.

By June 2013, Chandler held the rank of Commander in the United States Navy and was the Captain of the Arleigh Burke-class guided missile destroyer USS Nathan James (DDG-151).  That year, he and his crew took on paleomicrobiologists Dr. Rachel Scott (Rhona Mitra) and Dr. Quincy Tophet (Sam Spruell) as the Nathan James conducted operations at the Arctic.  However, their mission, unknown to even them, was just a cover for Drs. Scott and Tophet, who were actually collecting samples of a deadly virus that has infected 80 percent of the human population while they have been at sea.

The first season revolves around finding and creating a cure for the virus (called the Red Flu by those on land) while staying ahead of the RFS Vyerni, a Russian Navy Kirov-class battlecruiser commanded by Admiral Konstantin Ruskov, who were looking for the cure for themselves so they could become the new "owners" of the world.  During a rescue operation undertaken near Jamaica, CDR Chandler and Tex Nolan (John Pyper-Ferguson), the private security/military contractor who joined the Nathan James at Guantanamo Bay detention camp, were lost at sea and then taken captive by Admiral Ruskov.  The two of them were rescued by the Nathan James, and upon their escape, detonated a set of explosives left by the boarding party that ultimately sunk the Vyerni with all hands (save for Niels Sørensen (Ebon Moss-Bachrach), a Norwegian scientist held prisoner by Ruskov).

With the Russians defeated and a cure synthesized, the Nathan James makes port in Baltimore, Maryland, where they meet up with Amy Granderson (Alfre Woodard), the Vice Chair of the President's Defense Policy Board and mother of one of Chandler's officers, who claims to be the leader of what's left of the United States government. As Chandler frantically searches for his family (who have traveled to Baltimore from Virginia to meet him), he learns that Granderson and her rogue Maryland State Troopers are killing the people infected with the virus and burning their bodies to power the city, intent that only the "proper" people survive to aid humanity.  CDR Chandler finds his dad and his children and is able to cure them, but is too late to save his wife, who had succumbed to the virus just before he arrived.

With the Nathan James under siege by Granderson's people, CDR Chandler and his few landlocked crewmembers take the fight to Granderson, teaming up with the underground resistance against Granderson led by Andrew Thorwald (Titus Welliver), a former Baltimore Police Department officer. Together, they were able to stop her, but Thorwald was killed in the attempt, and Granderson chose to commit suicide rather than be arrested by Chandler.

After liberating Baltimore, the ship returns home to Norfolk, where they cure the town and reunite with several teams of Navy pilots and SEALs and scattered remnants of other branches of the U.S. Armed Forces and civilian medical and scientific experts. Although CDR Chandler planned to retire in order to take care of his family, his father convinced him that his place was on the Nathan James.

CDR Chandler and the Nathan James's next opponents are a group of natural Immunes led by former Royal Navy Lieutenant Commander Sean Ramsey (Brían F. O'Byrne), who have taken command of the  HMS Achilles.  The Immunes have also brainwashed the United States Secretary of Housing and Urban Development, Jeffrey Michener (Mark Moses), who is the sole surviving member of the Cabinet of the United States and Presidential Line of Succession.

After the defeat of the Immunes and the successful creation of the "contagious cure" by Dr. Scott, the Nathan James is put into drydock in St. Louis, Missouri, where Michener is sworn in as President of the United States by a surviving judge on December 23, 2013. One of Michener's first inaugural acts as president is to promote CDR Chandler to the position of Chief of Naval Operations.

As Chief of Naval Operations, Chandler holds the rank of Captain, having turned down a promotion to Admiral, saying that "[Captain] suits him better"; it was also mentioned that as there was no current United States Secretary of Defense, CAPT Chandler serves as President Michener's de facto military commander.  He retook command of the Nathan James in "Shanzhai" after the capture of CAPT Mike Slattery and six members of his crew and names LT Granderson acting Executive Officer over LT Cameron Burk, a senior lieutenant who held the conn while CAPT Slattery was off-ship.  Upon the rescue of the prisoners of war in "Dog Day", CAPT Chandler returns command of the ship to CAPT Slattery.

Upon completing his mission to prevent Chief of Staff Allison Shaw (Elisabeth Röhm) and the regional leaders from dissolving the United States, CAPT Chandler, haunted by the loss of his crew since the outbreak of the virus, Rachel, his wife, President Michener, his father (who was killed when Shaw kidnapped his children), and Tex (who gave his life in the final showdown with Shaw), resigned his commission.

16 months after leaving the Navy, Tom and his family had relocated to Greece, where he worked as a fisherman.  There, he crossed paths with Giorgio Vellek (Jackson Rathbone), a Greek-American crime lord, his sister Lucia (Sibylla Deen) (whom he romances for information) and eventually reunites with the crew of the Nathan James''.  Tom decided to rejoin the Navy and help resolve the Red Rust crisis. By the episode "Casus Belli", Tom had been promoted to Admiral and was teaching at the Naval Academy instead of serving on active duty.

As an admiral in the United States Navy, Chandler carries a Beretta M9 in 9×19mm as his personal sidearm; he also frequently uses the M4A1 carbine in 5.56×45mm.  Over the course of the series, ADM Chandler has killed numerous times in the line of duty.

Awards and decorations
The following are the medals and service awards fictionally worn by ADM Chandler.

The Last Ship (novel)
Chandler is loosely based on the captain, "Thomas" (whose full name is never revealed), of the United States Navy guided missile destroyer USS Nathan James (DDG-80) in the 1988 post-apocalyptic fiction novel, The Last Ship, written by William Brinkley.

References

Fictional admirals
Fictional characters from Virginia
Television characters introduced in 2014
Fictional commanders
Fictional Iraq War veterans
Fictional military captains
Fictional sea captains
Fictional United States Navy personnel
The Last Ship (TV series)